The Taiwan Strait Crises refers to conflicts involving the Republic of China and the People's Republic of China.

 The First Taiwan Strait Crisis (1954–1955)
 The Second Taiwan Strait Crisis (1958)
 The Third Taiwan Strait Crisis (1995–1996)